Camillo dei Principi Ruspoli (10 January 1882 – 5 September 1949), was the 2nd and last Principe di Candriano and Prince of the Holy Roman Empire, son of Emanuele Ruspoli, 1st Prince of Poggio Suasa, and second wife Laura Caracciolo dei Principi di Torella, Duchi di Lavello, Marchesi di Bella.

His maternal uncle, Giuseppe Caracciolo (1849 – 1920), Patrizio Napolitano, married twice and without issue, was the 1st Prince of Candriano (formerly Marquis of Candriano) (12 May 1893 – 1 October 1920).

Marriage and child 
In Rome, on 29 April 1905, he married Baronne Marie Marguerite Blanc (daughter of French Baron Albert Blanc and wife Natalia Terry y Dorticós) (Madrid, 7 May 1884 – 22 November 1961), by whom he had an only son:

 Don Emanuele Alberto dei Principi Ruspoli (Rome, 24 February 1906 – Paris, 31 August 1929), unmarried and without issue.

Notable published works 
He composed the ballet fantasy Festival of the Gnomes (which was orchestrated, conducted and recorded by Les Baxter in 1951).

Ancestry

See also 
 Ruspoli

References

External links 
 Camillo Ruspoli on a genealogical site (incomplete).

1882 births
1949 deaths
Nobility from Rome
Camillo